Kiva is a village in Haljala Parish, Lääne-Viru County, in northeastern Estonia.

The southwestern part of the Rutja Airfield is located on the territory of Kiva.

References

 

Villages in Lääne-Viru County